The Marlow-Hunter 22 is an American trailerable sailboat that was designed by Glenn Henderson as daysailer and racer, first built in 2010. It is a development of the 2003 Hunter 216, but with the hull built of fiberglass, instead of thermo-plastic

The design was originally marketed by the manufacturer in 2010 as the Hunter 22, but was usually referred to as the Hunter 22-2 to differentiate it from the unrelated 1981 Hunter 22 design. When Marlow bought the company in 2012 it was officially renamed the Marlow-Hunter 22.

Production
The design is built by Hunter Marine in the United States. Production started in 2010 and the design remained in production through 2018.

Design
The Marlow-Hunter 22 is a recreational keelboat, built predominantly of fiberglass. It has a fractional sloop B&R rig with no backstay, a plumb stem, a rounded, open reverse transom, a transom-hung rudder controlled by a metal tiller and a lifting keel. It displaces  and carries  of lead ballast.

The design emphasizes cockpit space at the expense of lower deck accommodation. It does have a V-berth in the bow and room for a portable head. In 2018 the manufacturer's base price was US$29,990.

See also
List of sailing boat types

Related development
Hunter 22

Similar sailboats
Alberg 22
Cape Dory 22
Capri 22
Catalina 22
CS 22
DS-22
Edel 665
Falmouth Cutter 22
J/22
Marshall 22
Nonsuch 22
Pearson Electra
Pearson Ensign
Santana 22
Seaward 22
Spindrift 22
Starwind 223
Tanzer 22
US Yachts US 22

References

External links

Keelboats
2010s sailboat type designs
Sailing yachts
Trailer sailers
Sailboat type designs by Glenn Henderson
Sailboat types built by Hunter Marine